John McKeown (born 21 April 1981) is a former professional footballer who has played for several clubs in the Scottish Football League.

Career
Released by Ipswich Town as a teenager, McKeown made his league debut for Ayr United in a First Division game against Falkirk in May 2000. He later played for Dumbarton, Cowdenbeath and Stenhousemuir and had a spell at Junior level with Cumnock Juniors.

McKeown was forced to retire as a professional player at the age of twenty-seven due to problems with an arthritic hip. He re-entered the game as player-coach of Wishaw Juniors in the summer of 2011, and was appointed manager of the club in October that year, eventually leading the club to their first promotion in thirty-eight years in 2014.

In October 2014, McKeown was announced as the new manager of Cumnock Juniors. He resigned from the club in October 2017 after a successful 3-year period at the club winning The super 1st Div title and leading the club to 2 cup finals and 5 semi finals. The following month, McKeown joined the coaching staff at Cambuslang Rangers.

On the 31 May 2018 McKeown became manager of Shotts Bon Accord.

References

External links 

1981 births
Living people
Footballers from Glasgow
Scottish footballers
Ayr United F.C. players
Dumbarton F.C. players
Cowdenbeath F.C. players
Stenhousemuir F.C. players
Scottish football managers
Scottish Football League players
Scottish Junior Football Association players
Cumnock Juniors F.C. players
Wishaw F.C. players
Association football central defenders
Scottish Junior Football Association managers